Arrows Ostrava is a baseball team from Ostrava, Czech Republic. The team plays in the Czech Extraliga.

History
The club was established in 1973 as Permon Ostrava. In 1976 the team changed its name to Permon Sokol Pustkovec and in 1985 to TJ VOKD Poruba. In 1996, the baseball section split from VOKD Poruba and changed its name to SK Arrows Ostrava.

In 2005, 2006, 2008, 2009, 2017 and 2020 the team finished as runner-ups and won the Extraliga championship in 2018, 2019 and 2021.

Roster

Achievements
 Extraliga : 3 (2018, 2019, 2021)

References

External links
 Official club webpage

Baseball in the Czech Republic
Sport in Ostrava
Baseball teams established in 1973
1973 establishments in Czechoslovakia